The Maharaja's College is a government college of higher education located in Kochi, Kerala. Established in 1875, it is one of the oldest colleges in India.

History 

This multidisciplinary centre of higher learning had its humble beginnings as a single room English school started by the Royal (Kingdom of Cochin) Shankara Warrier in 1845 "to impart such instruction to the students as would enable them to converse with Englishmen without the aid of an interpreter". The school was upgraded to a college in 1875 and in June 1925 the college acquired its present name. The college provided instruction in Mathematics, Physics, Chemistry, Zoology, History and Economics. At that time there were two hostels and physical education, literary and science associations functioning in full swing. Sir C. V. Raman and Dr S. Radhakrishnan were among the speakers at the Golden Jubilee celebrations in 1925.

The first PG course was started in 1947 in the Department of Chemistry, which already had research facilities holding to M.Sc. and Ph.D. The government of Kerala recognised it as a Centre of Excellence in the state and the University Grants Commission awarded the college with Potential for Excellence (CPE) status based on the NAAC Accreditation results. UGC awarded Autonomous status to the college.

Campus

Library 

The college library is 135 years old and has a collection of nearly one lakh (hundred thousand) books, including a prestigious collection of rare literature books. The reference section itself has 2000 books. However, lack of space is one of the vexing problems of the library. A reference and information section, inter-library networking and Internet facility are some of the immediate requirements of the library.

Sport facilities 

The university has 18 acres of land specifically dedicated to sports, including a 400-meter synthetic track, football and cricket grounds, courts for field hockey, volleyball, basketball, kho-kho, kabaddi and badminton, futsal, table tennis, carrom, chess, wrestling, weightlifting, judo, powerlifting etc.

Staff and students co-operative society 

The Maharaja's College staff and students co-operative society Ltd. no. 207, functioning on the campus, aims at promoting the spirit of cooperation and independence among its members. The society runs a bookshop in which textbooks and notebooks and various study materials are made available for students. It also houses a photocopying machine where photocopying is done at a fixed rate.

Career guidance cell 

A career guidance centre was started on the college campus in 1994, with a view to enable the students to manage themselves and to provide personal counseling on environment and qualifications for entry into various careers. In spite of the fact that the centre is still in its infancy and has few infrastructural facilities, it could arrange campus interviews for Cochin Maintenance Centre, NITT and Eureka Forbes. Many lectures on career opportunities are arranged on a regular basis by the centre.

Hostels 

The Maharaja's College Rama Varma hostels include the new hostel for men and the ladies' hostel. The former has 90 rooms with a capacity of 240 students and two tutors; the latter has facilities for only 104 students and one tutor. Nowadays, the demand for accommodation in the ladies' hostel is greater than the availability due to the increase in the number of girl students. To remedy this situation, a concrete proposal for a women's hostel has been submitted to UGC during the IX plan.

Old Students Association 

An Old Students Association formed in 1925 still functions on the college campus and its members have been involved in many of the activities of the college, such as arranging lectures by eminent personalities and awarding prizes to rank holders. It has also played an instrumental role in initiating the ongoing restoration work of the college

Courses  
The college conducts 22 Under Graduate courses ,  24 postgraduate courses and 11 doctorate programmes. Maharaja's also offers PhD programmes under almkst departments.

UG Programs 
 BA HISTORY
 BA ECONOMICS
 BA ECONOMICS(HONS)
 BA PHILOSOPHY
 BA POLITICAL SCIENCE
 BA ISLAMIC HISTORY
 BA MUSIC
 BA ENGLISH
 BA MALAYALAM
 BA HINDI
 BA ARABIC
 BA SANSKRIT
 BSC BOTANY
 BSC ZOOLOGY
 BSC CHEMISTRY
 BSC PHYSICS
 BSC MATHEMATICS
 BSC ENVIRONMENTAL CHEMISTRY
 BSC PHYSICS INSTRUMENTATION
 BCOM FINANCE AND TAXATION

PG Programs 
 MA PHILOSOPHY
 MA ECONOMICS
 MA POLITICAL SCIENCE
 MA HISTORY
 MA ISLAMIC HISTORY
 MA ENGLISH
 MA ARABIC
 MA HINDI
 MA SANSKRIT
 MA MALAYALAM
 MA MUSIC
 MSC BOTANY
 MSC ZOOLOGY
 MSC CHEMISTRY
 MSC MATHEMATICS
 MSC PHYSICS
 MSC STATISTICS
 MSC APPLIED CHEMISTRY
 MSC ANALYTICAL CHEMISTRY
 MSC PHARMACEUTICAL CHEMISTRY
 MSC GEOLOGY
 MCOM FINANCE

Integrated Programs 
 Archeology And Material And Cultural Studies

Milestones 
 1875 - The Cochin Rajas Elementary school started by Cochin Sarkar is upgraded into a college. Mr. Alfred Forbes Sealy, M.A. took charge as the first principal. It was Mr. Sealy who had designed the building and hence the name Sealy block. F.A. (First examination in Arts) course started.
 1908 - Intermediate course started
 1909 - Two separate hostels started - one for Hindu students and another for Christian students
 1910 - First college magazine published - on the occasion of the 60th birthday of the Cochin Maharaja, Sir Sri Rama Varma.
 1925 - Golden Jubilee. Sir C.V. Raman and Dr. S. Radhakrishnan visited the college. The college got its present name - "Maharajas College". The college was raised to a first grade college providing instructions in Mathematics, Physics, Chemistry, Zoology, History and Economics affiliated to Madras University. Old Students Association formed.
 1930 - Three new blocks added to the college.  plot donated to the college - Maharajas ground established.
 1935 - Diamond Jubily. B.Sc. Courses in Mathematics, Physics, Chemistry and Zoology started.
 1947 - B.Sc. Botany started. Year of India's independence. Students' political activities reached new peaks. Student activists hoisted Indian national flag in the Campus and got brutally beaten up by the royal police.
 1948 - The department of Chemistry that already had research facility started the first P.G. course.
 1949 - Following the integration of Travancore and Cochin states, the college is transferred from Madras University to Travancore University.
 1951 - New courses - B.A. (Hons.), M.A. Economics, B.Sc. (Hons.), M.Sc. Mathematics.
 1954 - New course - M.Sc. Applied Chemistry.
 1956 - Pre University course started. M.A. Malayalam and M.A. English started.
 1957 - The college comes under Kerala University. M.Sc. Physics started.
 1959 - New courses - B.A.Sanskrit, M.A. History, M.A. Hindi, M.Sc. Zoology.
 1964 - Pre University Course metamorphed into Pre Degree course. New courses - B.A. Politics, B.A. Philosophy
 1968 - New courses - B.A.English, B.A. Islamic History, B.A. Arabic
 1971 - New courses - M.A. Philosophy, M.A. politics, M.A. Sanskrit
 1975 - Centennial - completed 100 years - celebrations in great style with science exhibitions, seminars, symposia etc.
 1977 - New Centenary Auditorium inaugurated.
 1979 - New course - M.A. Arabic.
 1981 - New courses - M.A. Islamic History.
 1983 - Affiliation changed to newly formed Mahatma Gandhi University.
 1990 - Maharaja's College declared Centre of Excellence. Departments of Chemistry, Hindi, Malayalam and Physics recognised as research centres for research towards Ph.D., under Mahatma Gandhi University.
 1993 - Maharaja's won overall championship of the Mahatma Gandhi University youth festival. A feat to be repeated in 1994, 1995, 1998 and 2000.
 1995 - New course - M.Sc. Statistics.
 1996 - New courses - B.Sc. Physics - Instrumentation and B.Sc. Environment and Water Management.
 1997 - R. Shankar Award for the best Government College presented to Maharajas.
 1998 - New course - B. A. Music
 1999 - New course - B.Com. with Computer Applications.
 2000 - Completes 125 glorious years. Accredited by National Assessment and Accreditation Council. Maharajas goes online.
 2006 - Re-accredited by National Assessment and Accreditation Council at A - level.
 2007 - Maharaja's College Ground gets synthetic tracks for conducting international athletic events. Students of the college win overall championship of the Mahatma Gandhi University Silver Jubilee youth festival.
 2009 - Edusat facility installed. Becomes part of Ernakulam cluster of colleges.
 2010 - Maharaja's wins overall championship of the Mahatma Gandhi University youth festival. College selected as a "College with Potential for Excellence" by the University Grants Commission.
 2012 - New course - M.Com. with Finance.
 2013 - Re-accredited (Third cycle) by National Assessment and Accreditation Council at A - level.
 2013 - New course - B.A. Honors in Economics
2014 - Berlin Bench - the friend shade in memory of Berlin Babu was established
 2017 - Mridula Gopi became first woman chairperson in 70 years

Notable alumni 

 A. K. Antony, former Chief Minister of Kerala and Former Defence Minister of India 
 Aashiq Abu, film director, producer
 Amal Neerad, film director, cinematographer
 Anju Joseph, singer
 Antony Varghese, actor
 Anu Sivaraman, judge, High Court of Kerala
 Anwar Rasheed, film director, producer
 Ashitha, author
 Babu Namboothiri, film actor
 Baburaj, film actor
 Balachandran Chullikkadu, poet, film actor, lyricist, screenplay writer
 Bibin George, actor and writer
 Biju Narayanan, playback singer
 Binoy Viswam, Former Member of Parliament
 C. V. Subramanian, mycologist, Shanti Swarup Bhatnagar Prize recipient
 Changampuzha, poet
 Chinmayananda Saraswati, founder of Chinmaya Mission & Vishwa Hindu Parishad
 Chitharesh Natesan, Mr. Universe, 2019
 Dileep, film actor
 Jibin George Sebastian, music composer, lyricist and entrepreneur 
 John Paul Indian scriptwriter, producer, author and actor.
 Jyothirmayi, film actress
 K. G. Balakrishnan, former Chief Justice of India
 Justice K. K. Usha, former Chief Justice of Kerala
 K. P. Appan, literary critic
 K. R. Gowri Amma, former minister of Kerala
 K. S. Manilal, taxonomist
 K. Satchidanandan, poet
 K. Sukumaran, former judge of Bombay and Kerala High Courts
 Kalabhavan Abi, actor
 Krishnaswamy Kasturirangan, former chairman of the Indian Space Research Organisation
 M. Achuthan, Orator 
 M. Leelavathy, writer, academic
 M. N. Vijayan, writer
 Mammootty, film actor
 Mary Verghese, physician
 Mercy Ravi, writer, senior Mahila Congress leader and former MLA
 N. S. Madhavan, author, civil servant 
 Nadirshah, actor, director 
 O. Chandrashekar, Olympian and Asian Games Gold Medal winner in football 
 P. K. Chathan Master, former minister of Kerala
 P. T. Thomas, MLA
 Priya A. S., writer
 R. Ramachandran, poet
 Radha Vinod Raju, IPS
 Rajeev Ravi, film director, cinematographer, producer
 S. D. Shibulal, co-founder and former CEO of Infosys
 Sabareesh Prabhaker, violinist 
 Salim Kumar, film actor, comedian
 Sameer Thahir, film director, cinematographer
 Sarayu, actress
 Sebastian Paul, politician, former Member of Parliament
Seethi Sahib, speaker, community leader
 Justice Shaji P. Chaly, Judge of Kerala High Court
 Shibu Chakravarthy, poet, lyricist
 Subhash Chandran, writer
 Sujatha Mohan, singer
 Sunil P. Ilayidom, critic
 T. A. Venkitasubramanian, biochemist, Shanti Swarup Bhatnagar Prize recipient
 T. V. R. Shenoy, journalist, columnist
 T.M. Thomas Isaac (1956), Finance Minister of Kerala
 Tini Tom, film Actor, comedian
 Vaikom Viswan, Former LDF Convenor
 Vaisakhan (1956), writer, playwright, and screenwriter
 Vayalar Ravi, former Cabinet Minister for Overseas and Civil Aviation Affairs of India and Senior Congress Leader
 Venu Rajamony I.F.S, Diplomat and Ambassador of India to the Kingdom of Netherlands
 Vijayalakshmi, Malayalam Poet
 Vyloppilli Sreedhara Menon, poet

References

External links 

 

 
Arts and Science colleges in Kerala
Universities and colleges in Kochi
Colleges affiliated to Mahatma Gandhi University, Kerala
1875 establishments in India
Educational institutions established in 1875
Academic institutions formerly affiliated with the University of Madras